The Baltic News Service (BNS) is the largest news agency operating in the Baltic States. Founded in April 1990, by a group of students (the founding CEO was Allan Martinson), it sought to inform foreign correspondents in Moscow of developments in the Baltic States' struggles for independence from the Soviet Union. Within a few months, it had been recognized by numerous Western media sources.

Today, BNS is a holding company for separate organizations in Estonia, Latvia, and Lithuania.

BNS disseminates news in Russian and English (as well as the domestic languages of Estonian, Latvian, and Lithuanian) via the internet and by other means. Subscribers include media, financial, industrial, and government institutions in the Baltic States. BNS also collaborates with Agence France-Presse, Reuters, and Interfax.

In 2003, the BNS publishing company in Estonia, BNS Kirjastus, bought the bankrupt news agency ETA (Eesti Teadeteagentuur).

BNS was wholly owned by the Finnish media group Alma Media from 2001 until March 2014 when it was sold to Uudisvoog OÜ, a company fully owned by the Estonian Ilmar Kompus who is also the proprietor of the Sky Plus radio station.

Later, BNS was acquired by Eesti Meedia (now Postimees Group), which is owned by Estonian entrepreneur Margus Linnamäe through investment firm MM Group. In late 2015, BNS was effectively joined by LETA (Latvia's formerly state-owned news agency) when UP Invest (a subsidiary of MM Group) acquired most shares in the Latvian agency. To satisfy regulatory concerns, Eesti Meedia sold Latvian BNS operations (subsequently renamed Latvian News Service) and media monitoring service Mediju Monitorings to a third-party Estonian company named AMP Investeeringud on 31 August 2015. Later, it was discovered that most employees of the Latvian News Service and Mediju Monitorings were transferred to LETA, but was not disclosed to the Latvian authorities at the time of the acquisition. On 18 January 2019, the Competition Council of Latvia imposed a €32,200 fine on MM Group.

See also
 Baltic News Network

References

External links
 BNS Estonia
 BNS Lithuania
 BNS Latvia

1990 establishments in Lithuania
News agencies based in Estonia
Mass media companies of Latvia
Mass media companies of Lithuania
Organizations based in Tallinn
Holding companies of Estonia